We Rose Up Slowly is a 1964 painting by Roy Lichtenstein. Materials includes oil and magna on two canvas panels. The painting measures  x . It was exhibited at the Art Institute of Chicago. and Centre Pompidou. It is in the collection of the Museum für Moderne Kunst.

Description
Laura Barnett of The Guardian wrote that the painting depicts "two all-American archetypes — a handsome man, a luscious blonde — in a steamy embrace." The painting is adapted from a panel in the  romance comic Girls' Romances #81 (National Periodical, Jan. 1962).

See also
 1964 in art

References

1964 paintings
Paintings by Roy Lichtenstein